Nazzareno Berto (born 20 February 1957) is an Italian former racing cyclist. He rode in the 1979 Tour de France and in four editions of the Giro d'Italia.

Major results
1976
 1st Trofeo Piva
 1st Stage 4 Girobio
1978
 1st Trofeo Città di San Vendemiano
1980
 1st Giro di Toscana
1981
 3rd Milano–Torino
1984
 10th Milano–Torino

References

External links
 

1957 births
Living people
Italian male cyclists
Cyclists from the Province of Padua